Nottinghamians RFC is a rugby union club that plays in Holme Pierrepont in Nottingham, England. The club started out as Old Nottinghamians, a club for former pupils of Nottingham High School. The club's ground, on Adbolton Lane next to the National Watersports Centre, is still owned by the Old Nottinghamians Sports Club. In the summer the ground is used by Nottingham Cricket Club. Since 1971, the club has been known simply as "Nottinghamians", and it is no longer a requirement that members should be old boys of the High School.

Nottinghamians RFC currently runs two men's open age sides and one men's veteran side. Owing to the connections with the High School it was never deemed appropriate for the club to run junior sides.

The first XV plays in the Midlands Division of the RFU league structure and are currently in Midlands 4 East (North) having been promoted into the division following the cancellation of Midlands 5 East (North) at the end of the 2017-18 season.

Currently, a number of Nottinghamians players also play for Nottingham Outlaws rugby league club. They also have a number of students from the University of Nottingham and Nottingham Trent University as well as some old boys from the High School.

External links
Club Website
2005/2006 League Table
The Old Nottinghamians' Society

English rugby union teams
Sport in Nottingham
Rugby union in Nottinghamshire
Rugby clubs established in 1971
1971 establishments in England